The Church of St Nicholas is an Anglican parish church in Bathampton, Somerset, standing between the River Avon and the Kennet and Avon Canal. Built in the 13th century, with a 15th-century tower and 18th and 19th century restorations, it has been designated as a Grade II* listed building. The church is particularly noted for its Australia Chapel, which celebrates Admiral Arthur Phillip, the first Governor of New South Wales who was buried there in 1814, while the churchyard contains several other significant tombs.

The parish is part of the benefice of Bathampton with Claverton.

History

The church has its origins in the 13th-century, with John Stafford serving as one of its first vicars. During the 15th century it was altered with a chapel being added in 1500 and tower added in 1532. This three stage tower contains six bells, two of which date from the 1540s.

In the mid 18th century Ralph Allen added Gothic components after he acquired Bathampton Manor in 1731.  These features were mostly replaced by the rebuilding of the north aisle in 1858 by Henry Goodridge and the restoration of the chancel in 1882 by Charles Edward Davis.

On either side of the main door are brass plaques which serve as War Memorials to those from the village who died in World War I and World War II.  Next to the porch is a medieval bowl which was used as the font.

Australia Chapel
The "Australia Chapel" in the south aisle contains memorials to the Allen family and to Admiral Arthur Phillip, the first Governor of New South Wales. Phillip was buried in the church after his death in 1814 and although it was unnoticed for many years, the grave was discovered in 1897 and the Premier of New South Wales, Sir Henry Parkes, had it restored. However, in 2007, Geoffrey Robertson QC alleged that Phillip's remains may no longer be in St Nicholas': "...Captain Arthur Phillip is not where the ledger stone says he is: it may be that he is buried somewhere outside, it may simply be that he is simply lost. But he is not where Australians have been led to believe that he now lies." The windows of the sanctuary carry the coat of arms of the Federal Government and the six Australian States.

Churchyard

Buried in the churchyard is the body of Adolphe, Viscount du Barry, a French aristocrat and close friend of Madame du Barry, Louis XV's mistress. The Vicomte was living in Bath when he was killed in a duel with Captain Rice, an Irish adventurer.

Other notable local figures, such as Walter Sickert, are also buried in the churchyard, with many of the other chest tombs designated as listed buildings.

See also
 List of ecclesiastical parishes in the Diocese of Bath and Wells

References

External links
 

13th-century church buildings in England
Church of England church buildings in Bath and North East Somerset
Grade II* listed churches in Somerset
Grade II* listed buildings in Bath and North East Somerset